Benjamin Thomas Willbond (born 18 January 1973) is an English actor and screenwriter best known as a member of the British Horrible Histories troupe in which he appears in the TV series Horrible Histories, Yonderland and Ghosts. He is best known for his numerous roles in the CBBC children's programme Horrible Histories, running from 2009 to 2013. As well as starring as various characters throughout the show's run, he also, along with the other five main actors, wrote numerous episodes. Again alongside the same five actors, he also stars as “Captain” in the 2019 TV series Ghosts. Along with Laurence Rickard, he co-wrote the 2022 feature length television comedy We Are Not Alone.

Early life
Willbond was a forces child and consequently his family moved around every two years. He was sent to board at Stamford School in Lincolnshire, when he was nine years old. He was bullied whilst attending the school. Willbond when talking about his experience at the school said "I don't actually remember that time because it was so shocking". He read Russian and French at St Catherine's College, Oxford.

Career
Along with Arnold Widdowson, Willbond was part of the comedy duo "Ben & Arn", who won Perrier Award for "Best Newcomer" in 1999, and formed the self-proclaimed "thinking man's French pop duo" Priorité à Gauche. He then went on to perform his solo character shows at several Edinburgh Fringe Festivals, the last being in 2005 which also starred Katy Brand and Jim Field Smith.

He is perhaps best known for his regular role in CBBC's Horrible Histories, in which he played a wide variety of historical figures, most memorably recurring roles as Henry VIII and Alexander the Great. Along with the five other members of the Horrible Histories starring cast, Willbond is also the co-creator, -writer and -star of Yonderland, a family fantasy comedy series that premiered on SkyOne on 10 November 2013. In addition he is the co-writer of Bill, a BBC-produced comedy film based loosely around the early life of William Shakespeare, which involved the same starring troupe.

Previously, Willbond had starred in a short-lived sketch show for ITV2 called Laura, Ben & Him with Marek Larwood and sometime writing partner Laura Solon. He also appeared in Solon's BBC Radio 4 sketch show, Laura Solon: Talking and Not Talking. Other notable television work includes the recurring roles of Steve Warwick in the BBC comedy Rev, Adam Kenyon in BBC Four's The Thick of It and as a television director in the movie-length final episode of the Ricky Gervais comedy Extras (BBC Two). He has also appeared in Katy Brand's Big Ass Show for ITV2 and Mayo for BBC One.

Willbond's other radio credits include BBC Radio 4 series Deep Trouble,  Double Science (co-written with Justin Edwards), Recorded for Training Purposes and the first series of Electric Ink. He also starred in the YouTube romantic comedy "Nigel and Victoria."

His 2010 short film Tooty's Wedding, which he co-wrote with Solon, won numerous international comedy awards and was screened as part of the 2012 Sundance Film Festival. Other notable film work includes the movie Starter for 10 (2006). In 2007 he had a short appearance in St Trinian's, as a nervous school inspector.

He is currently starring in BBC's Ghosts with the other main Horrible Histories cast.

Personal life
Willbond is a keen cricketer and plays for the Thunderers.

Awards

Filmography

References

External links
Official Website

Official Twitter Site

1973 births
British comedians
English male stage actors
English male television actors
Living people
People educated at Stamford School
Alumni of St Catherine's College, Oxford